
, also known by her alias Holi, is a Japanese singer, songwriter, composer and arranger.

Kobayashi collaborated with Brian Eno and U2 on their 1995 project, the Passengers. Her smash hit debut song,  from 1985s popular show "Kinyōbi no Tsumatachi e" made her famous in Japan.

She was born in Tokyo and first began singing at age 15 and writing, later, songs for other artists that became big hits at home and abroad making her famous. She received a degree in Philosophy from the prestigious Gakushuin University in Tokyo. Her first proper job in the music industry was as a secretary at a music publishing company, which she got through a professor from university. She debuted as a writer in 1984, writing the song "Moon Eyes" for folk duo Bread & Butter. Then, in 1985, she released her debut single . The song became an instant hit, and earned Kobayashi a nomination for best newcomer at the 27th Japan Record Awards. Staff that worked on the recording began to compare Kobayashi's voice to that of Karen Carpenter, lead singer of The Carpenters, and suggested she approach Richard Carpenter. After hearing her demo tape, and enjoying the melody and vocals, Richard announced that her album "City of Angels" would be released in 1988.

In 1991, Kobayashi relocated to the United Kingdom and released an album under the name "holi". Soon after, she released a cover album of The Carpenters' songs. In 2001, she married a British accountant.

Discography

Singles

Albums

Original albums

Special albums

As "holi"

Cover renditions
"Una At Huling Mamahalin" (translated in Japanese English song as "Fall In Love") - a Filipino pop ballad rendition by Louie Heredia in 1996, and also covered by Filipino pop singer Kimpoy Feliciano in 2008.

References

External links
Nippop profile
Fansite (Archived 2009-10-24)
Office Seto profile

1958 births
Living people
Japanese women pop singers
Singers from Tokyo